The 2016 Coupe Banque Nationale was a tennis tournament played on indoor carpet courts. It was the 24th edition of the Tournoi de Québec and part of the WTA International tournaments of the 2016 WTA Tour. It took place at the PEPS de l'Université Laval in Quebec City, Canada, from September 12 through September 18, 2016.

Points and prize money

Point distribution

Prize money

Singles main draw entrants

Seeds

1 Rankings are as of August 29, 2016

Other entrants
The following players received wildcards into the singles main draw:
 Françoise Abanda
 Aleksandra Wozniak
 Carol Zhao

The following players received entry from the qualifying draw:
 Lauren Davis
 Amandine Hesse
 Barbora Krejčíková
 Danielle Lao 
 Jamie Loeb
 Tereza Martincová

The following player received entry as a lucky loser:
 Barbora Štefková

Withdrawals
Before the tournament
 Tímea Babos →replaced by  Elitsa Kostova
 Anna-Lena Friedsam →replaced by  Jessica Pegula
 Bethanie Mattek-Sands →replaced by  Barbora Štefková
 Monica Niculescu →replaced by  Catherine Bellis
 Francesca Schiavone →replaced by  Ekaterina Alexandrova
 Anna Tatishvili →replaced by  Ysaline Bonaventure

Doubles main draw entrants

Seeds

1 Rankings are as of August 29, 2016

Other entrants
The following pairs received wildcards into the doubles main draw:
 Françoise Abanda /  Elena Bovina
 Eugenie Bouchard /  Jessica Pegula

Champions

Singles

 Océane Dodin def.  Lauren Davis, 6–4, 6–3

Doubles

 Andrea Hlaváčková /  Lucie Hradecká def.  Alla Kudryavtseva /  Alexandra Panova, 7–6(7–2), 7–6(7–2)

References

External links
Official website

Coupe Banque Nationale
Tournoi de Québec
Coupe Banque Nationale
2010s in Quebec City